The 2004 D.C. United season was the eighth season of the club's existence. It was highlighted by winning their first MLS Cup championship since 1999.

The season was hallmarked by United winning their fourth Major League Soccer championship, winning MLS Cup 2004 3–2 over Kansas City Wizards. To date, this was the last time in franchise history that the team has won an MLS Cup title. Additionally, by winning the championship, some cite that it marked a "second golden age" in United. Following the 2004 title, United would go on to win two MLS Supporters' Shields, to claim the most in the league, as well as their second U.S. Open Cup title.

In terms of player and manager transactions, the offseason saw English head coach Ray Hudson end his two-season stint with the club, as United management fired him out of dissatisfaction with his results as a manager. United signed retired MLS star Piotr Nowak to the role of head coaching duties. Hitherto, no other head coach had been a former MLS player. The signing of Nowak marked a new trend of first-generation MLS players assuming coaching duties for second generation MLS players.

In 2003, United made national and international headlines by drafting 14-year-old prospect Freddy Adu as the first pick of the MLS SuperDraft. MLS orchestrated a series of negotiations between United and Dallas Burn, who had the first overall selection. A series of agreements between the two sides gave Dallas additional allocation from United so that Adu could play for his local club, as he grew up near Potomac, Maryland.

Review and events

Preseason 
January
 Freddy Adu signs with D.C. United
February
March

Regular season 
April
May
June
July
August
September
Early October

Playoffs 
Late October
November
 United deft. NE Revs in the 2004 Eastern Conf. championship to go to MLS Cup 2004. Considered best match in MLS history
 United win their first MLS Cup title since 1999 with a 3–2 win over the Kansas City Wizards at the Home Depot Center

Non-competitive

Midseason exhibitions

Competitive

Major League Soccer

Results by round

Results 

Source: RSSSF

MLS Cup

Conference semifinals

Conference final

MLS Cup

U.S. Open Cup

Club

Roster

Statistics 
List of squad players, including number of appearances by competition  

|}

Transfers

In

SuperDraft picks

Out
Sourced list of players sold or loaned out during the season

Awards
Only official awards regarding individuals associated with the club

FA Premier League Player of the Month (January): Patrick Scorer
FA Premier League Manager of the Month (January): Lucas Boss

See also
MLS Cup 2004
2004 U.S. Open Cup
2004 Major League Soccer season

Notes

References

2004
Dc United
Dc United
2004 in sports in Washington, D.C.
MLS Cup champion seasons